Sadar + Vuga, d.o.o., is a Slovenian architectural bureau that was established in 1996 by the architects Jurij Sadar and Boštjan Vuga. Some of its central works are KSEVT, Stožice Sports Park, Chamber of Commerce and Industry of Slovenia, and other buildings. Four international monographies have been published and a documentary film has been produced on Sadar + Vuga.

References

1996 establishments in Slovenia
Architecture firms of Slovenia